Wei Chao (born 18 March 1993) is a Chinese footballer currently playing as a forward for Qingdao Hainiu.

Club career
Having started his career in France with Metz, where he was top scorer in the under-16 league, Wei returned to China to forge a career in the lower leagues.

Personal life
Wei is the brother of fellow professional footballer, Wei Jian.

Career statistics

Club
.

Notes

References

1993 births
Living people
People from Guiyang
Footballers from Guizhou
Chinese footballers
Association football forwards
China League One players
China League Two players
FC Metz players
Chengdu Tiancheng F.C. players
Shenzhen F.C. players
C.D.C. Montalegre players
Chinese expatriate footballers
Chinese expatriate sportspeople in France
Expatriate footballers in France
Chinese expatriate sportspeople in Portugal
Expatriate footballers in Portugal